Meta-Trek is a 1980 video game published on disk only by The Alternate Source for TRS-80 32K microcomputers.

Contents
Meta-Trek is a Star Trek style game where the object is to explore and claim as many of the 256 available quadrants as possible, while destroying enemy Binarians.

Reception
J. Mishcon reviewed Meta-Trek in The Space Gamer No. 37. Mishcon commented that "All in all, I would say that for those interested in a first rate original-Trek style game, this fits the bill nicely."

References

1980 video games
TRS-80 games
TRS-80-only games
Video games developed in the United States